Shining a Light: A Concert for Progress on Race in America is a live benefit concert presented by A&E Networks and iHeartMedia, that aired on November 21, 2015 on six different television networks. The two-hour concert featured performances by Eric Church, Jamie Foxx, Sia, Rhiannon Giddens, Tori Kelly, John Legend, Miguel, Pink, Jill Scott, Ed Sheeran, Bruce Springsteen, Sting, Pharrell Williams, and Zac Brown Band.

References

2010s American television specials
2015 television specials
A&E Networks
American live television shows
Benefit concerts
IHeartMedia